Hypobapta barnardi, or Barnard's grey, is a moth of the family Geometridae first described by Gilbert Macarthur Goldfinch in 1929. It is found in the Australian states of Queensland, New South Wales, South Australia and Western Australia.

The wingspan is about 30 mm. Adults are grey with two jagged black lines across each forewing, and one across each hindwing.

The larvae feed on Eucalyptus odorata.

References

Moths described in 1929
Pseudoterpnini